Monchy-le-Preux is a commune in the Pas-de-Calais department in the Hauts-de-France region of France.

Geography
Junction 15 of the A1 autoroute is just a mile away.

History
Monchy was an important strategic position near to Arras during the 1914-18 war and bloody fighting ensued around the village. During the Battle of Arras it was from here that the Germans bombarded Arras and destroyed the belltower. Just outside Monchy, on the D939, a carved Vauthier Stone marks the boundary of the advancing German army during the First World War.

Population

Places of interest
 The Commonwealth War Graves Commission cemetery.
 The church of St.Martin, rebuilt along with much of the village, after World War I.
 Monchy-le-Preux (Newfoundland) Memorial commemorating the sacrifice of the soldiers of the Newfoundland Regiment on 14 April 1917.
 Two chapels.
 Remains of an old chateau.
 Windmill British Cemetery

See also
Communes of the Pas-de-Calais department

References

External links

 The CWGC cemetery

Monchylepreux